Michael Rich (born 23 September 1969) is a German former professional road bicycle racer who won the gold medal for his native country in the men's team time trial (100 km) at the 1992 Summer Olympics in Barcelona, Spain. His winning teammates were Christian Meyer, Bernd Dittert and Uwe Peschel.

Rich is most famous for his individual time trial participations in the Grand Tours (Tour de France, Giro d'Italia and Vuelta a España). He is the father of two children.

Rich retired from racing in 2006. His profession was a mechanic.

Major results

1989
 8th Overall Peace Race
1990
 3rd Chrono des Herbiers
1991
 4th Chrono des Herbiers
1994
 1st Stage 4a (ITT) Regio-Tour
 1st Stage 2 Peace Race
 3rd Time trial, National Road Championships
 UCI Road World Championships
3rd  Team time trial
10th Time trial 
1996
 2nd Overall Bayern Rundfahrt
 3rd Time trial, National Road Championships
 10th Time trial, Olympic Games
1997
 4th HEW Cyclassics
1998
 7th HEW Cyclassics
 7th Coppa Bernocchi
1999
 2nd Overall Regio-Tour
1st Stage 3b (ITT)
 6th Overall Tour Trans Canada
1st Stage 10 (ITT)
 6th Grand Prix des Nations 
 9th Veenendaal–Veenendaal
2000
 1st  Time trial, National Road Championships
 1st  Overall Tour de la Somme
1st Stage 1 
 1st EnBW Grand Prix (with Torsten Schmidt)
 2nd Overall Bayern Rundfahrt
1st Stage 1b 
 2nd  Time trial, UCI Road World Championships
 4th Grand Prix des Nations
 7th Overall Circuit Franco-Belge
2001
 1st Stage 1a (ITT) Niedersachsen-Rundfahrt
 4th Grand Prix Eddy Merckx (with Uwe Peschel)
 6th EnBW Grand Prix (with Uwe Peschel)
 10th Overall Circuit de la Sarthe
2002
 1st  Overall Bayern-Rundfahrt
1st Stage 2 (ITT)
 1st Chrono des Herbiers
 1st Karlsruher Versicherungs Grand-Prix (with Uwe Peschel)
 1st Stage 4 (ITT) Deutschland Tour
 1st Stage 4 (ITT) Tour du Poitou-Charentes et de la Vienne
 1st Stage 4b (ITT) Niedersachsen-Rundfahrt
 2nd  Time trial, UCI Road World Championships
 2nd Time trial, National Road Championships
 2nd Grand Prix Eddy Merckx (with Uwe Peschel)
 4th Grand Prix des Nations
2003
 1st  Time trial, National Road Championships
 1st  Overall Bayern-Rundfahrt
1st Stage 2 (ITT)
 1st Chrono des Herbiers
 1st Grand Prix des Nations
 1st Grand Prix Eddy Merckx (with Uwe Peschel)
 1st Karlsruher Versicherungs Grand-Prix (with Sebastian Lang)
 3rd  Time trial, UCI Road World Championships
 4th Niedersachsen-Rundfahrt
1st Stage 1a (ITT)
2004
 1st  Time trial, National Road Championships
 1st Grand Prix des Nations
 1st Stage 1 (ITT) Deutschland Tour
 1st Stage 4 (ITT) Hessen-Rundfahrt
 2nd  Time trial, UCI Road World Championships
 2nd LuK Challenge Chrono (with Uwe Peschel)
 3rd Grand Prix Eddy Merckx (with Uwe Peschel)
 4th Time trial, Olympic Games
 8th Overall Sachsen Tour
 9th Overall Bayern Rundfahrt
1st Stage 3 (ITT)
2005
 1st  Time trial, National Road Championships
 1st  Overall Bayern-Rundfahrt
 1st Stage 2 (ITT) Ster Elektrotour
 2nd Overall Rheinland-Pfalz Rundfahrt
 2nd LuK Challenge Chrono (with Markus Fothen)
2006
 2nd Time trial, National Road Championships

References

1969 births
Living people
Cyclists at the 1988 Summer Olympics
Cyclists at the 1992 Summer Olympics
Cyclists at the 1996 Summer Olympics
Cyclists at the 2004 Summer Olympics
Cyclists from Baden-Württemberg
German male cyclists
Olympic cyclists of Germany
Olympic cyclists of West Germany
Olympic gold medalists for Germany
Sportspeople from Freiburg im Breisgau
Olympic medalists in cycling
Medalists at the 1992 Summer Olympics